was a town located in Higashitagawa District, Yamagata Prefecture, Japan.

On July 1, 2005, Amarume, along with the town of Tachikawa (also from Higashitagawa District), was merged to create the town of Shōnai.

Dissolved municipalities of Yamagata Prefecture